Kilderry is a rural area in County Kerry, Ireland. It lies close to the N70 National secondary road between Milltown (2.6 km) and Killorglin (4.8 km). The townlands of Kilderry North and Kilderry South are in the civil parish of Kilcolman.

References

Townlands of County Kerry